The Kuznetsov NK-89 was an experimental alternative fuel turbofan engine, designed by the Kuznetsov Design Bureau.

Development 
The NK-89 was a modified version of the hydrogen-powered NK-88 and was designed to run on both liquified natural gas (LNG) and kerosene. It was intended for use on the proposed Tupolev Tu-156, a modified version of the Tupolev Tu-154B. This aircraft was to have cryogenic tanks in the rear of the cabin and forward baggage hold to store the LNG. Kerosene would be carried in the wing tanks. In January 1989, a test flight of a prototype of this engine was carried out onboard of the Tupolev Tu-155 flying laboratory where LNG was used as fuel.

By default, the engine would run on LNG, but kerosene could be used when flying out of airports where LNG is unavailable or in case of emergency. The switch from LNG to kerosene could be made in-flight in 5 seconds.

Applications 
 Tupolev Tu-155 (testbed)
 Tupolev Tu-156M (proposed)
 Tupolev Tu-156S (proposed)

Specifications (NK-89)

See also

References 

Low-bypass turbofan engines
1980s turbofan engines
Kuznetsov aircraft engines